Paraćin Airport , also known as the Davidovac Airport (Serbian: Аеродром Давидовац, Aerodrom Davidovac) is a civil airport near the town of Paraćin, Serbia. Its runway is 900 metres long and 50 metres wide.

See also 
Paraćin
List of airports in Serbia

External links 

Paraćin airport information (PDF)

Paracin